Narong Chok-Umnuay (born 21 September 1944) is a Thai former swimmer. He competed in two events at the 1964 Summer Olympics.

References

1944 births
Living people
Narong Chok-Umnuay
Narong Chok-Umnuay
Swimmers at the 1964 Summer Olympics
Place of birth missing (living people)
Asian Games medalists in swimming
Narong Chok-Umnuay
Swimmers at the 1966 Asian Games
Medalists at the 1966 Asian Games
Narong Chok-Umnuay
Narong Chok-Umnuay